is a Japanese manual tie-dyeing technique, which produces a number of different patterns on fabric.

History
Much of the debate surrounds the technical capacities within Japan at the time to produce the variety of fabrics seen in some of the earliest  examples.

The earliest surviving examples of -dyed cloth date back to the mid-8th century, donated to the Tōdai-ji Buddhist temple in Nara in 756 CE, as part of the goods donated by the Emperor Shōmu upon his death. The techniques seen on these earliest fragments show bound resists, wax resists and folded and clamped resists. However, at least some of the -dyed fabric in this collection is Chinese in origin.

Surviving examples of resist-dyeing in China (known as ) date to a much earlier time period; the earliest surviving examples dating to 418 CE.

Techniques

Most techniques recognised within these three categories have names and a number of varieties of technique.

The technique chosen and the resulting dyed fabric depends upon both the type of fabric and the dyestuff used;  demands a pliant and easy-to-handle fabric, with some historic dyeing techniques – such as the original technique of  – now impossible to recreate entirely due to the fact that the fabric necessary for the technique is no longer produced.

Differing techniques may be combined in some cases to achieve increasingly more elaborate results.

is what is commonly thought of in the West as tie-dye. It involves binding certain sections of the cloth using thread – traditionally a type of untwisted thread known as  – to achieve the desired pattern. The pattern achieved depends on how tightly the cloth is bound and where the cloth is bound. If random sections of the cloth are bound, the result will be a pattern of random circles. If the cloth is first folded then bound, the resulting circles will be in a pattern depending on the fold used.

is also known as looped binding. It involves taking a hooked needle and plucking sections of the cloth. Then a thread is looped around each section twice. The thread is not knotted; tension is the only thing that holds the sections in place. The resulting dyed cloth is a water-like design. Because no knot is used,  is very easy to bind and unbind, making this technique commonly used.

is a pleated and bound resist. This technique involves pleating sections of the cloth very finely and evenly. Then the cloth is bound in very close sections. The result is a very specific spider-like design. This specific design requires very precise technique.

includes stitched . A simple running stitch is used on the cloth then pulled tight to gather the cloth. The thread must be pulled very tight to work, and a wooden dowel must often be used to pull it tight enough. Each thread is secured by knotting before being dyed. This technique allows for greater control of the pattern and greater variety of pattern, but it is much more time consuming.

is also known as pole-wrapping . The cloth is wrapped on a diagonal around a pole. Then the cloth is very tightly bound by wrapping thread up and down the pole. Next, the cloth is scrunched on the pole.

is a shaped-resist technique. Traditionally, the cloth is sandwiched between two pieces of wood, which are held in place with string. The fabric is typically folded more than once, creating a repeating pattern of resists throughout the fabric when unfolded.

The last  dyeworks, the Yoshimura dyeworks of Takasaki, closed in 1932, and the technique of dyeing was relatively unknown until investigation into it was undertaken in 2010 by Yoshiko Iwamoto Wada and Masanao Arai, with the assistance of the Yoshimura dyeworks archive and the Takasaki-Beni-no-Kai research group. The research discovered that the boards used in the  process were lacquered on all but the sides and centre to resist the dye, and were soaked in water for 2 weeks before dyeing, as dry boards would warp and distort the resist. The fabric was folded using the  technique, before a thin starch paste was applied to the faces of the boards to aid in the adhesion of the silk to its surface. The block was clamped tightly and hot dye was poured over the dye block – whilst rotating it to bathe every side in the dye – for three hours. This resulted in a perfect recreation of the crisp red-and-white pictorial designs of older  fabrics.

Modern textile artists, instead of using carved or uncarved wooden boards painted with lacquer, often use shapes cut from acrylic or plexiglass and holding the shapes with C-clamps. The shapes prevent the dye from penetrating the fabric they cover.

Gallery

See also
Tie-dye

Notes

References

Further reading
 Dubrawsky, Malka. Optical illusion: combining  with commercial fabrics. Quilting Arts. Dec/Jan 2009, pages 46–50
 Yoshiko Iwamoto Wada, Mary Kellogg Rice, and Jane Barton. : the inventive art of Japanese shaped resist dyeing. Tokyo: Kodansha International, 1983.
 Galli, Andrew and Yoshiko Iwamoto Wada. "Arimatsu, Narumi shibori celebrating 400 years of Japanese artisan design". (DVD) produced by Arimatsu Shibori Mutsumi-kai (Japan) ; Studio Galli Productions (USA) Fremont, Calif. 2007
 Southan, Mandy.  Designs & Techniques. Tunbridge Wells, Kent, UK: Search Press, 2009.

External links
 
 World  Network
 kyoto shibori museum

Japanese words and phrases
Japanese dyeing techniques